The 2013 TaxSlayer.com Gator Bowl was a post-season American college football bowl game held on January 1, 2013, at EverBank Field in Jacksonville, Florida in the United States. The 68th edition of the Gator Bowl began at noon EST and aired on ESPN2. It featured the Mississippi State Bulldogs from the Southeastern Conference (SEC) against the Northwestern Wildcats from the Big Ten Conference and was the final game of the 2012 NCAA Division I FBS football season for both teams.  The Bulldogs accepted their bowl bid after an 8–4 regular season, while the Wildcats accepted theirs after a 9–3 finish.  It was the first time that the two teams had met.  Northwestern won the game by a score of 34 – 20.

Teams

Mississippi State

With a 3–0 start in conference play (and a 7–0 start overall), the season had a bright outlook for the Bulldogs.  However, the schedule's increasing difficulty put the Bulldogs in decline, only finishing at 4–4 and fourth place in the SEC Western Division.

This was the Bulldogs' second Gator Bowl; they had previously played in the 2011 game, soundly defeating the Michigan Wolverines by a score of 52–14.

Northwestern

The Wildcats were undefeated out of conference and posted a 5–3 Big Ten record, good for third place in the Legends Division.  Only a one-point loss to the Nebraska Cornhuskers and an overtime loss to the Michigan Wolverines kept the Wildcats from the division title and a trip to the conference championship game.

This game was the Wildcats' first Gator Bowl; it was also their unprecedented fifth consecutive bowl game. The Wildcats got their first bowl victory since the 1948 team won the 1949 Rose Bowl over the California Golden Bears by a score of 20–14.

Game summary

Scoring summary

Statistics

Game notes
Mississippi State opened as a 2-point favorite, but by kickoff Northwestern was the favorite -2.5

References

Gator Bowl
Gator Bowl
Mississippi State Bulldogs football bowl games
Northwestern Wildcats football bowl games
Gator Bowl
21st century in Jacksonville, Florida